In differential geometry, the Margulis lemma (named after Grigory Margulis) is a result about discrete subgroups of isometries of a non-positively curved Riemannian manifold (e.g. the hyperbolic n-space). Roughly, it states that within a fixed radius, usually called the Margulis constant, the structure of the orbits of such a group cannot be too complicated. More precisely, within this radius around a point all points in its orbit are in fact in the orbit of a nilpotent subgroup (in fact a bounded finite number of such).

The Margulis lemma for manifolds of non-positive curvature

Formal statement 

The Margulis lemma can be formulated as follows.

Let  be a simply-connected manifold of non-positive bounded sectional curvature. There exist constants  with the following property.

Here  is the distance induced by the Riemannian metric.

An immediately equivalent statement can be given as follows: for any subset  of the isometry group, if it satisfies that: 
 there exists a  such that ; 
then  contains a nilpotent subgroup of index .

Margulis constants 

The optimal constant  in the statement can be made to depend only on the dimension and the lower bound on the curvature; usually it is normalised so that the curvature is between -1 and 0. It is usually called the Margulis constant of the dimension.

One can also consider Margulis constants for specific spaces. For example, there has been an important effort to determine the Margulis constant of the hyperbolic spaces (of constant curvature -1). For example:

Zassenhaus neighbourhoods 

A particularly studied family of examples of negatively curved manifolds are given by the symmetric spaces associated to semisimple Lie groups. In this case the Margulis lemma can be given the following, more algebraic formulation which dates back to Hans Zassenhaus.

If  is compact this theorem amounts to Jordan's theorem on finite linear groups.

Thick-thin decomposition 

There is a tautological decomposition into a disjoint union .

Let us restrict to the case of hyperbolic manifolds of finite volume. Then its thin part has two sorts of components:

Cusps: these are the unbounded components, they are diffeomorphic to a flat -manifold times a line;
They are bounded and (if  is orientable) diffeomorphic to a circle times a -disc.

In particular, a complete finite-volume hyperbolic manifold is always diffeomorphic to the interior of a compact manifold (possibly with empty boundary).

Other applications 

The Margulis lemma is an important tool in the study of manifolds of negative curvature. Besides the thick-thin decomposition some other applications are:

The collar lemma: this is a more precise version of the description of the compact components of the thin parts. It states that any closed geodesic of length  on an hyperbolic surface is contained in an embedded cylinder of diameter of order .
The Margulis lemma gives an immediate qualitative solution to the problem of minimal covolume among hyperbolic manifolds: since the volume of a Margulis tube can be seen to be bounded below by a constant depending only on the dimension, it follows that there exists a positive infimum to the volumes of hyperbolic n-manifolds for any n.
The existence of Zassenhaus neighbourhoods is a key ingredient in the proof of the Kazhdan–Margulis theorem.
One can recover the Jordan–Schur theorem as a corollary to the existence of Zassenhaus neighbourhoods.

See also
Jorgensen's inequality gives a quantitative statement for discrete subgroups of the isometry group  of the 3-dimensional hyperbolic space.

Notes

References 

Lie groups
Hyperbolic geometry
Differential geometry
Lemmas